Kizhinginsky District (Khejengyn aimag) is an administrative and municipal district (raion), one of the twenty-one in the Republic of Buryatia, Russia. It is located in the south of the republic. Its administrative center is the rural locality (a selo) of Kizhinga. As of the 2010 Census, the total population of the district was 16,509, with the population of Kizhinga accounting for 38.6% of that number.

History
The district was established on December 12, 1940, when its territory was split from Khorinsky District.

Administrative and municipal status
Within the framework of administrative divisions, Kizhinginsky District is one of the twenty-one in the Republic of Buryatia. The district is divided into two selsoviets and seven somons, which comprise twenty-one rural localities. As a municipal division, the district is incorporated as Kizhinginsky Municipal District. Its two selsoviets and seven somons are incorporated as nine rural settlements within the municipal district. The selo of Kizhinga serves as the administrative center of both the administrative and municipal district.

References

Notes

Sources

Districts of Buryatia
States and territories established in 1940
 
